United St Saviour's Charity is a charity in the London Borough of Southwark, London, England. Its purpose is to alleviate poverty in Southwark by providing housing for older persons in their almshouses, by making charitable grants to local charities and organisations, direct charitable services and research and influencing activities. It was founded as the Corporation of Wardens of the Parish of St Saviour, Southwark in 1541.

History
The Corporation of Wardens of the Parish of St Saviour, Southwark was incorporated in 1541 to administer the affairs of the parish of Southwark St Saviour. The parish was created as a merger of St Margaret and St Mary parishes and the wardens inherited the assets of the Guild of the Assumption of St Margaret's Church, which had been incorporated in 1449. The corporation ceased to have any role in civil administration from 1855 when the St Saviour's District was created. The St Saviour's vestry nominated members to the St Saviour's District Board of Works. In 1900 the corporation had its ecclesiastical role removed, which left only the charitable functions intact. The civil parish of St Saviour was abolished in 1930. The charity also took over Hopton's Charity in 2012.

The charity still maintains vestiges to its past through giving honorary titles of the Wardens to Trustees including Warden of the Great Account, Renter Warden and Bell Warden.

The charity's earliest benefactors included Thomas Cure who died in 1588. He was one of the Wardens, Saddler to Elizabeth I, and MP for Southwark. At his death he left the land and properties in Park St SE1 for development of almshouses for the poor of the parish. The charity still owns the properties on this land right by Borough Market, and uses the rent from the various commercial pubs, shops and homes to fund its work. The original almshouses lasted until 1868 when the new railway line into London Bridge Station forced their move to West Norwood. These buildings stood until 2006 when they were sold for redevelopment, and the new almshouse was opened at St Saviour's Court in Purley, south London. The charity also holds an annual service in Southwark Cathedral to commemorate the life of Thomas Cure

Other benefactors include Jane Hargrave, Edward Hewlett, Edward Alleyn, and Mary Reading. The Charity is naming its new Appleby Blue almshouse in Bermondsey, due for completion in 2022, after Dorothy Appleby, who died in 1684.

Governance
United St Saviour's Charity is a charitable company with charity number 1103731. It was incorporated on 13 May 2004. The charity can have up to 12 trustees, who are normally connected to Southwark through their work or home.

The Board meet up to 5 times per year. There are two subcommittees which focus on grant making and finances. The head office is based in Crucifix Lane in London.

The charity is corporate trustee to the linked United St Saviour's Endowment Charity and Hopton's Charity.

Activities
The charity provides grants to other organisations in Southwark through its Community Investment programme. The grants budget is approximately £1m per annum, but is often more than this as result of awarding grants using external funds.

The charity's almshouses at St Saviour's Court and Hopton's Gardens provide 73 residential units for people usually older than 65 years of age.  The new almshouse development at 94-116 Southwark Park Road will be called Appleby Blue Almshouse and provides an additional 57 homes.

The charity also has a research and influence focus, developing partnerships with research funders and research institutions. Its main focus is housing and ageing, and the impact on health and wellbeing.

References

External links

Charities based in London
Organisations based in the London Borough of Southwark